Events in the year 2018 in the State of Palestine.

Incumbents
State of Palestine (UN observer non-member State)
President: Mahmoud Abbas (PLO) 
Prime Minister: Rami Hamdallah 
Gaza Strip (Hamas administration unrecognized by the United Nations)
Prime Minister: Yahya Sinwar (Hamas)

Events
May 30 – United Nations warns that escalation Gaza is on a "Brink of War".

Deaths

25 January – Ghassan Shakaa, politician, former mayor of Nablus (b. 1943).

24 March – Rim Banna, singer, composer and activist (b. 1966)

21 April – Fadi Mohammad al-Batsh, engineer and academic (b. 1983)

See also 
List of violent incidents in the Israeli–Palestinian conflict, 2018

References

 
2010s in the State of Palestine
Years of the 21st century in the State of Palestine
Palestine
Palestine